On the Reeperbahn at Half Past Midnight (German:Auf der Reeperbahn nachts um halb eins) may refer to:

 "On the Reeperbahn at Half Past Midnight" (song) 
 On the Reeperbahn at Half Past Midnight (1929 film)
 On the Reeperbahn at Half Past Midnight (1954 film) 
 On the Reeperbahn at Half Past Midnight (1969 film)